This article contains information about the literary persons, events and publications of 1915.

Events
January – The Geração de Orpheu launch the short-lived magazine Orpheu, introducing literary modernism to Portugal.
January 13 – "Reminiscences of Sergeant Michael Cassidy", the first known story by Captain H. C. McNeile, Royal Engineers, writing as "Sapper", begins in the Daily Mail (London).
February 28 – Rupert Brooke sails with the British Mediterranean Expeditionary Force, but develops sepsis from an infected mosquito bite. This ends with his death in a hospital ship off Skyros. His collection 1914 & Other Poems, including the sonnet "The Soldier", appears posthumously in May.
March – Ford Madox Ford's novel The Good Soldier: A tale of passion is published by John Lane – The Bodley Head in London under this title, and under the author's original name, Ford Madox Hueffer, although he had intended it to be called The Saddest Story.
March 26 – Virginia Woolf's first novel, The Voyage Out, is published in London by the firm of her half-brother, Gerald Duckworth.
April 6 – The American Ezra Pound's poetry collection Cathay, "translations... for the most part of the Chinese of Rihaku, from the notes of the late Ernest Fenollosa, and the decipherings of the Professors Mori and Ariga", by Elkin Mathews, is published in London.
April 24 – Deportation of Armenian notables from Constantinople begins. Among the writers, poets, teachers and literary critics killed are Dikran Chökürian, Armen Dorian, Melkon Giurdjian, Ardashes Harutiunian, Jacques Sayabalian, Ruben Sevak, Siamanto, and Rupen Zartarian. (Survivors include Yervant Odian and Alexander Panossian.)
May 3 – The rondeau "In Flanders Fields" by the Canadian poet John McCrae is written; it is first published on December 8 in the London magazine Punch.
May 7 – The Sinking of the RMS Lusitania claims 1,198 victims. The Americans among them in this torpedo attack on a civilian passenger liner include the writer and playwright Justus Miles Forman (born 1875), the theatrical producer Charles Frohman (born 1856), the writer and philosopher Elbert Hubbard (born 1856) and his second wife Alice Moore Hubbard (born 1861), and the playwright Charles Klein (born 1867). The survivors include the British-born writer and educator Ian Holbourn and the bookseller Charles E. Lauriat, Jr.
May 13 – As Julian Grenfell stands talking with other officers, a shell lands some yards away and a splinter hits him in the head. He is taken to a hospital in Boulogne, where he dies 13 days later. His poem "Into Battle" is published in The Times the following day. His younger brother Gerald William (Billy) Grenfell is killed in action two months later.
c. May – Publication of the first modern book illustrated with wood engravings, Frances Cornford's Spring Morning, from the Poetry Bookshop, London, has engravings by her cousin Gwen Raverat.
June 24 – The Widener Library at Harvard University is dedicated.
June 26 – August 14 – P. G. Wodehouse's novel Something Fresh is serialized in The Saturday Evening Post (U.S.), introducing the character of Lord Emsworth of Blandings Castle. It first appears in book form on September 3 in New York, from D. Appleton & Company, and on September 16 in London, from Methuen.
August/September – John Buchan's thriller The Thirty-Nine Steps, set just before the outbreak of war and introducing as hero Richard Hannay, is serialised in Blackwood's Magazine. Book publication follows in October by William Blackwood and Sons in Edinburgh.
August–December – Ezra Pound completes the early sections of his poem The Cantos.
September 15 
P. G. Wodehouse's story "Extricating Young Gussie" is published in The Saturday Evening Post (U.S.). It introduces as characters Jeeves and Bertie.
New Culture Movement: Chen Duxiu establishes the New Youth magazine in Shanghai, China.
September 30 – Methuen, publishers of D. H. Lawrence's new novel The Rainbow, are prosecuted in London under the Obscene Publications Act 1857 and its sale is banned. The U.S. edition appears in November without any legal challenge.
October – Franz Kafka's seminal novella The Metamorphosis (Die Verwandlung) is first published in Die Weißen Blätter (Leipzig). Kafka finishes writing The Trial (Der Process) this year, but it will not be published until 1925, the year after his death.
October 15 – Detective Story Magazine is first published by Street & Smith of New York, a successor to Nick Carter Stories.
October 27 – Leonid Andreyev's play He Who Gets Slapped premieres at the Moscow Art Theatre
November – The German author Heinrich Mann's essay on Émile Zola in Die Weißen Blätter marks Zola's political commitment and attacks the economic causes of the war. This temporarily disrupts Mann's relations with his younger brother, the novelist Thomas Mann.
unknown dates
James Joyce, Tristan Tzara and Vladimir Lenin all take up residence in Zurich, in a coincidence to be exploited in Tom Stoppard's 1974 play Travesties.
Alfred A. Knopf, Sr. establishes the publishers Alfred A. Knopf in New York City.
The Goudy Old Style serif typeface is created by Frederic Goudy for American Type Founders.

New books

Fiction
Ryūnosuke Akutagawa – "Rashōmon" (羅生門, short story published in Teikoku Bungaku)
Victor Appleton – Tom Swift and His Aerial Warship
Ruby M. Ayres – Richard Chatterton, V.C.
Mariano Azuela – The Underdogs (Los de abajo)
E. F. Benson – The Oakleyites
Stella Benson – I Pose
John Buchan – The Thirty-nine Steps
Willa Cather – The Song of the Lark
Joseph Conrad – Victory
Arthur Conan Doyle – The Valley of Fear
Theodore Dreiser – The "Genius"
Caradoc Evans – My People: Stories of the Peasantry of West Wales
Edna Ferber – Emma Mc Chesney and Co. 
Ronald Firbank – Vainglory
Ford Madox Hueffer – The Good Soldier
Charlotte Perkins Gilman – Herland
Anna Katharine Green – The Golden Slipper, and Other Problems for Violet Strange
Hermann Hesse – Knulp
Franz Kafka – The Metamorphosis
D. H. Lawrence – The Rainbow
Jack London – The Little Lady of the Big House
Arthur Machen
Compton Mackenzie – Guy and Pauline
The Bowmen; and Other Legends of the War
The Great Return
W. Somerset Maugham – Of Human Bondage
Oscar Micheaux – The Forged Note: A Romance Of The Darker Races
Mori Ōgai (森 鷗外) – Sansho the Steward (山椒大夫, Sanshō Dayū)
John Muir 
Travels to Alaska
Letters to A Friend
Natsume Sōseki (夏目 漱石) – Grass on the Wayside (道草, Michikusa)
E. Phillips Oppenheim 
 The Game of Liberty
 Mr. Grex of Monte Carlo
Baroness Orczy 
A Bride of the Plains
The Bronze Eagle
P. D. Ouspensky – Strange Life of Ivan Osokin (Странная жизнь Ивана Осокина)
Eleanor H. Porter – Pollyanna Grows Up
Dorothy Richardson – Pointed Roofs
Sax Rohmer – The Yellow Claw
Rafael Sabatini – The Sea Hawk
Ruth Sawyer – The Primrose Ring
 Edgar Wallace 
 The Man Who Bought London
 The Melody of Death
Jean Webster – Dear Enemy
H. G. Wells – Boon
Luang Wilatpariwat – Khwam mai phayabat (No Vendetta; first full-length Thai novel, adapted from English)
Harry Leon Wilson – Ruggles of Red Gap
P. G. Wodehouse 
Something Fresh
Psmith, Journalist
Virginia Woolf – The Voyage Out

Children and young people
Gerdt von Bassewitz – Peter and Anneli's Journey to the Moon (Peterchens Mondfahrt)
L. Frank Baum 
The Scarecrow of Oz
Aunt Jane's Nieces in the Red Cross (as Edith Van Dyne)
Waldemar Bonsels – Himmelsvolk (People in the Sky)
Frances Hodgson Burnett – The Lost Prince
Edgar Rice Burroughs – The Return of Tarzan
Russell Thorndike – Doctor Syn: A Tale of the Romney Marsh
Else Ury
Nesthäkchen's First School Year
Nesthäkchen in the Children's Sanitorium

Drama
Susan Glaspell – Suppressed Desires
Avery Hopwood
Fair and Warmer
Sadie Love
Agha Hashar Kashmiri – Bilwamangal
Cleves Kinkead – Common Clay
Louis N. Parker – Mavourneen
Patrick Pearse – The Singer (written)
Quintero brothers
Becquerina
Diana cazadora
Caton Theodorian – Bujoreștii
Horace Annesley Vachell – The Case of Lady Camber
Leonid Andreyev - He Who Gets Slapped
 Maxim Gorky - The Old Man

Poetry

C. J. Dennis – The Songs of a Sentimental Bloke (verse novel)
T. S. Eliot – The Love Song of J. Alfred Prufrock
H. B. Elliott, ed. – Lest We Forget: A War Anthology
Geoffrey Faber – Interflow, Poems Mainly Lyrical
Rudyard Kipling – "My Boy Jack"
Francis Ledwidge – Songs of the Fields
Vladimir Mayakovsky – A Cloud in Trousers
Alice Meynell – Poems of the War
Barbu Nemțeanu – Stropi de soare
Fernando Pessoa – Opiário and Ode Marítima 
Jessie Pope – Jessie Pope's War Poems and More War Poems

Non-fiction
John Hay Beith – The First Hundred Thousand
John Buchan – Nelson's History of the War (begun)
Hall Caine – The Drama of 365 Days: Scenes in the Great War
Maxim Gorky – In the World (В людях) 
Rudyard Kipling – The Fringes of the Fleet (essays and poems)
Friedrich Naumann – Mitteleuropa
May Sinclair – A Journal of Impressions in Belgium
Percy Sykes – A History of Persia
Zhonghua Da Zidian (中華大字典) (Great Chinese Dictionary)

Births
January 1 – Branko Ćopić, Bosnian Serb writer (suicide 1984)
January 6 – Alan Watts, British/American philosopher (died 1973)
January 28 – Nien Cheng, Chinese-born American writer (died 2009)
February 2 – Khushwant Singh, Indian novelist and journalist (died 2014)
February 11 – Patrick Leigh Fermor, British author (died 2011)
March 8 – Drue Heinz, born Doreen English, British-American patron (died 2018)
March 13 – Protiva Bose (Ranu Shome), Bengali singer and writer (died 2006)
March 18 – Richard Condon, American novelist (died 1996)
March 26 – Hwang Sun-won, Korean fiction writer (died 2000)
April 12 – Július Tomin, Czech writer known for promoting Interlingua (died 2003)
April 15 – Hilda Bernstein, English-born author, artist, and anti-apartheid activist (died 2006)
April 24 – Salvador Borrego, Mexican journalist, historical revisionist and neo-nazi writer (d. 2018)
May 5 – Emanuel Litvinoff, Anglo-Jewish writer (died 2011)
May 8 – Milton Meltzer, American historian and author (died 2009) 
May 10 – Monica Dickens, English novelist (died 1992) 
May 12 – Joe David Brown, American novelist and journalist (died 1976)
May 27 – Herman Wouk, American novelist (died 2019)
June 10 – Saul Bellow, American writer (died 2005)
June 21 – Jesús Arango Cano, Colombian economist, diplomat, anthropologist, archaeologist and writer (died 2015)
June 22 – Thomas Quinn Curtiss, American writer, and film and theatre critic (died 2000)
July 1
Alun Lewis, Welsh poet in English (died 1944)
Jean Stafford, American fiction writer (died 1979)
July 7 – Margaret Walker, American poet and novelist (died 1998)
July 14 – Jerome Lawrence, American dramatist (died 2004)
July 31 – Herbert Aptheker, American historian (died 2003)
August 13 – Muhammad Ibrahim Joyo, Pakistani teacher, writer, scholar, and Sindhi nationalist (died 2017)
August 19 – Ring Lardner, Jr., American journalist and screenwriter (died 2000)
August 28 – Claude Roy, French poet (died 1997)
August 30 – Jack Simmons, English historian (died 2000)
September 8 – Benoît Lacroix, Canadian theologian and philosopher (died 2016)
September 17 – Adolfo Sánchez Vázquez, Spanish-born philosopher (2011)
September 21 – Gertrude Poe, American journalist (died 2017)
September 27 – Marjorie Chibnall, English medievalist, biographer and translator (died 2012)
October 17 – Arthur Miller, American dramatist (died 2005)
October 24 – Marghanita Laski, English biographer, novelist and broadcaster (died 1988)
November 8 – G. S. Fraser, Scottish poet and critic (died 1980)
November 12 – Roland Barthes, French literary theorist (died 1980)
November 16 – Jean Fritz, American children's writer (died 2017)
November 26 – Emilio D'Amore, Italian writer, journalist, and politician (died 2017)
December 6 – Nilawan Pintong, Thai writer (died 2017)
December 13 – Ross Macdonald, American-Canadian writer (died 1983)
December 22 – David Martin, Hungarian-born Australian poet (died 1997)
December 27 – John Cornford, English poet (died 1936)

Deaths
January 3 – James Elroy Flecker, English poet, novelist and dramatist (tuberculosis, born 1884)
January 19 – Elizabeth Boynton Harbert, American author, lecturer, reformer (born 1843)
February 4 – Mary Elizabeth Braddon, English popular novelist (born 1837)
April 8 – Louis Pergaud, French novelist (killed in action, born 1882)
April 19 – Julia Evelyn Ditto Young, American poet and novelist (born 1857)
April 23 – Rupert Brooke, English war poet (blood poisoning, born 1887)
May 7 (passengers drowned in the sinking of the Lusitania)
 Justus Miles Forman, American writer (b. 1875)
 Charles Frohman, American theater producer (b. 1856)
 Elbert Hubbard, American writer and philosopher (b. 1856)
 Alice Moore Hubbard, American wife of Elbert Hubbard (b. 1861)
 Charles Klein, American playwright (b. 1867)
May 11 – Lucy Bethia Walford, Scottish novelist and artist (born 1845)
May 26 – Julian Grenfell, English war poet (killed in action, born 1888)
July 5 – Aurelio Tolentino, Filipino dramatist (born 1867)
August 19 – Tevfik Fikret, Ottoman Turkish poet and journalist (diabetes, born 1867).
September 1 – August Stramm, German Expressionist poet and playwright (killed in action, born 1874)
September 27 – Remy de Gourmont, French Symbolist poet, novelist, and critic (stroke, born 1858)
October 17 – Edmond Laforest, Haitian French-language poet (suicide, born 1876)
November 14 – Booker T. Washington, American writer and educator (born 1856)
December 23 – Roland Leighton, English war poet (died of wounds, born 1895)

Awards
Nobel Prize for Literature: Romain Rolland (French)

References

See also
World War I in literature

 
Years of the 20th century in literature